Taekwondo at the 2014 Asian Games was held in Incheon, South Korea from September 30 to 3 October 2014. Men's and women's competitions had eight weight categories for each gender. All competition took place at the Ganghwa Dolmens Gymnasium. Each country was limited to having 6 men and 6 women.

Schedule

Medalists

Men

Women

Medal table

Participating nations
A total of 248 athletes from 37 nations competed in taekwondo at the 2014 Asian Games:

References

External links
 Schedule and results

 
2014 Asian Games
2014 Asian Games events
Asian Games
2014